25 to Life is the debut studio album by American Southern hip hop group PSC, released on June 28, 2005 under Atlantic and Grand Hustle Records. The album title "25 to Life" refers to the group members' ages at the time. Although the critical reviews are lukewarm, it peaked at #10 on the Billboard 200 chart on October 8, 2005.  The album features guest appearances from Young Jeezy, Young Dro, CeeLo Green, Lil Scrappy and Lloyd. Its production was handled by Keith Mack, Tony Galvin, DJ Montay, Lil Jon, Jasper Cameron, Cyber Sapp, Crown Kingz and Khao.

Single 
The lead single, "I'm a King", was featured on the 2005 American drama film, Hustle & Flow soundtrack and achieved commercial success. The song peaked at #67 on Billboard Hot 100 chart. It also certified Gold by RIAA for selling 500,000 copies. The song was remixed by Californian rapper The Game as diss track towards his rival 50 Cent.

Music videos 
Three videos were released for the album. The first one is for the single "I'm a King" and it has several scenes from the track featured film Hustle & Flow. The second one for "Do Ya Thang", which was featured in the video game Need for Speed: Most Wanted – the video contains many cars and has cameos by Southern rappers such as Alfa Mega, Xtaci and Young Jeezy. The third music video is for the song "Set It Out".

Track listing

Chart positions

Singles

References 

2005 debut albums
PSC (group) albums
Grand Hustle Records albums
Warner Music Group albums
Albums produced by Jasper Cameron
Albums produced by Lil Jon
Trap music albums